Donatville is a hamlet in northern Alberta, Canada within Athabasca County. The community has the name of Donat Gingras, a pioneer citizen. The first school opened in 1915.

Demographics 

As a designated place in the 2011 Census, Donatville had a population of 5 living in 3 of its 6 total dwellings, a 0% change from its 2006 population of 0.

See also 
List of communities in Alberta
List of hamlets in Alberta

References 

Athabasca County
Hamlets in Alberta
Former designated places in Alberta